Bangalaia margaretae is a species of beetle in the family Cerambycidae. It was described by E. Forrest Gilmour in 1956. It is known from Mozambique.

References

Endemic fauna of Mozambique
Prosopocerini
Beetles described in 1956